The Johansen CAJO 59 was a Danish twin-engined amphibious flying boat.  Built in the late 1960s, it achieved certification but did not go into production.

Design and development
The CAJO 59 was designed by Carl Johansen (hence the name) as a general purpose 3-4 seat amphibious flying boat.  It was a high-gull winged twin-engine monoplane with a wooden structure, mostly wooden skinned, apart from glass fibre/foam sandwich panels in the fuselage and fabric covered control surfaces. The wings inboard of the engines were built around two spars and had high dihedral (8.8°), which raised the engines well above the water.  Outboard of the engines the wings had a single spar and were without dihedral.  They carried full span slotted flaps and ailerons which were lowered when the flaps were fully extended.

The fuselage was flat sided with rounded decking, with the cabin under the wings.  Its conventional flying boat V-shaped planing bottom had a change of curvature near midpoint but no discrete step. The vertical tail was straight-tapered, the rudder fitted with a trim tab.  The cantilever variable incidence tailplane, with elevators, was mounted above the fuselage at about one third fin height.

The CAJO 59 was powered by two 65 hp (49 kW) Walter Mikron III inverted inline engines. Two fixed floats, mounted well outboard on single struts, stabilised flights off water.  It had a manually retractable tricycle wheeled undercarriage, with main legs mounted on the fuselage and retracting into it above the waterline.

The first flight was made from water on 25 July 1967 and the first from land on 17 April 1968.  Certification facilities were lacking in Denmark, so the CAJO 59 was taken to Germany and flew as D-GDFH during 1970.

Specifications

See also

References

1960s Danish civil utility aircraft
Amphibious aircraft
CAJO 59
High-wing aircraft
Gull-wing aircraft
Aircraft first flown in 1967
Flying boats
Twin piston-engined tractor aircraft